This is the progression of world record improvements of the pole vault W40 division of Masters athletics.

Key

References

Masters Athletics Pole Vault list

Masters athletics world record progressions
Pole vault